Halana Leith is a New Zealand netball player. She played in the ANZ Championship for the Waikato Bay of Plenty Magic from 2008–09. A goal attack for the Waikato provincial side, Leith became increasingly used as a wing attack with the Magic. She received little court time in two ANZ Championship seasons, and was injured during the 2009 major semi-final against the Melbourne Vixens. Leith was not signed for 2010.

References

External links
2009 ANZ Championship profile

New Zealand netball players
Waikato Bay of Plenty Magic players
ANZ Championship players
Netball players from Auckland
Living people
Year of birth missing (living people)